Grünau is a German locality (Ortsteil) within the Berlin borough (Bezirk) of Treptow-Köpenick. Until 2001 it was part of the former borough of Köpenick.

History
During 1747 and 1753 some settlements were founded by Frederick II of Prussia, as Müggelheim, Friedrichshagen and Grünau itself. The village, founded in 1749, was first mentioned in 1754 with the name of Grüne Aue. Until 1920 it was a Prussian municipality of the former district of Teltow, merged into Berlin with the "Greater Berlin Act".

For the 1936 Summer Olympics, the city hosted the canoeing and rowing events at the regatta course on the Langer See.

Geography

Overview
Located in the south-eastern suburb of Berlin, Grünau is bounded (in south-west) by the Brandenburger town of Schönefeld (in Dahme-Spreewald district). The Berliner bordering localities are Bohnsdorf, Altglienicke, Adlershof, Köpenick, Müggelheim and Schmöckwitz.

The quarter is surrounded by the Berliner Stadtforst and traversed by the river Dahme (tributary of the Spree) in the southern shore. In the lake Langer See, formed on the river, the islet of Großer Rohrwall belongs to Grünau.

Subdivision
Grünau is divided into 3 zones (Ortslagen):
 An der Regattastrecke
 Grünau-Ost
 Grünau-West

Transport
As urban rail, the locality is served by the S-Bahn lines S46, S8 and S85 (at the homonymous railway station); and by the tramway line 68. It also counts the BVG ferry line F12 in Wassersportallee, that links Grünau to Köpenick across the river Dahme.

Personalities
 Karl Dönitz (1891–1980), admiral and politician, last president of Nazi Germany
 Stefan Heym (1913–2001), writer. He lived several years in a villa of the locality

Photogallery

References

External links

1936 Summer Olympics official report. Volume 2. pp. 996–1029.
 Grünau page on www.berlin.de

Localities of Berlin

Venues of the 1936 Summer Olympics
Olympic canoeing venues
Olympic rowing venues